Peter Luger Steak House is a steakhouse located in the Williamsburg section of Brooklyn, New York City, with a second location in Great Neck, New York, on Long Island. It was named to the James Beard Foundation's list of "America's Classics" in 2002 and is the third oldest operating steakhouse in New York City, after Keens and Old Homestead Steakhouse.
On January 10 2022, Peter Luger's and Caesar's Palace announced the opening of a third location in Caesar's Palace Las Vegas, in the location formerly occupied by Rao's.

The Brooklyn location is known for its long wooden bar, and the "dining rooms have a Teutonic air, with exposed wooden beams, burnished oak wainscoting, brass chandeliers and weathered beer-hall tables".

In 2019, New York Times restaurant critic Pete Wells gave the restaurant a scathing, zero-star review, a decline from Frank Bruni's 2007 two-star review, a three-star review in 1995 by Ruth Reichl, and a four-star review in 1968 by Craig Claiborne.

History
The Brooklyn location was established in 1887 as "Carl Luger's Café, Billiards and Bowling Alley" in the then-predominantly German neighborhood that would shortly thereafter be in the shadow of the Williamsburg Bridge. German-born Peter Luger (1866–1941) was the owner, and nephew Carl was the chef. When Peter died in 1941, his son Frederick took over and the restaurant declined.

In 1950, Frederick shut the restaurant and put it up for auction. Bernard and Lester Magrill, local auctioneers and frequent patrons, conducted the auction. Sol Forman, and Seymour Sloyer who owned a metal giftware factory across the street, bought it as partners for a "whimsically low" bid. According to Lester Magrill, the purchase price was $35,000, which included the building as well as the restaurant. According to one history, "the neighborhood was declining, filling up with Hasidic Jews, whose kosher rules forbade the eating of Luger's hindquarters. Both Forman and Sloyer had been eating at Luger for twenty-five years, and they needed a place to take their clients. They were the only bidders during the auction. In 1968, Craig Claiborne of The New York Times gave a four star review of the steakhouse, under the new ownership.

In 1968, Forman and Sloyer opened a Great Neck, New York, location. It was closed in 1984 after a severe fire, but reopened a year and a half later in 1986.

Seymour Sloyer died in 2001 at the age of 85. Sol Forman died in 2001 at the age of 98. Ownership of the restaurant passed to Forman's daughters and Sloyer's wife and children.

In July 2009, while having dinner at Peter Luger, New York Governor David Paterson had Richard Ravitch secretly sworn in as Lieutenant Governor to oversee the stalemate-stricken State Senate.

In 2021, the restaurant opened a new branch in Ebisu, Tokyo.

In 2022, the restaurant lost its Michelin star.

Menu

The menu at Peter Luger is sparse, with the focal point being a porterhouse steak sized for two to four.

See also
 List of the oldest restaurants in the United States
 List of restaurants in New York City
 List of steakhouses

References

External links

German-American culture in New York City
German restaurants in the United States
Great Neck Peninsula
Restaurants established in 1887
Restaurants in Brooklyn
Steakhouses in New York City
Williamsburg, Brooklyn
James Beard Foundation Award winners
1887 establishments in New York (state)